Mbeli Bai is a 13 hectare swampy forest clearing in the Nouabalé-Ndoki National Park in the Republic of Congo.

History
Since the end of the 1990s the Wildlife Conservation Society has worked in the north of the Republic of Congo and in 1993 together with the Ministry of Forest Economy and Environment has created the Nouabalé-Ndoki National Park (4,200 km²). The Nouabalé-Ndoki National Park with its low levels of disturbance represents one of the last remaining intact forest blocs (no history of logging) in the Congo Basin and an important stronghold for western gorillas, forest elephants and other endangered forest mammals.

Researchers have been continuously monitoring the mammals visiting Mbeli Bai since February 1995 with the aim to increase  understanding of the biology of western gorillas and other large mammals that are otherwise difficult to study in the dense rain forest. Since 1995 more than 330 gorillas have been monitored (actual population ~130 gorillas) spanning more than 1750 gorilla years of around 55 gorilla units (groups and solitary silverbacks). The result of this monitoring of individual identifiable animals has provided major and unique insights into the social organization and behavior of this elusive species including many spectacular behavioral observations such as twin births, silverback splash displays and the first observation of tool use in free-ranging gorillas.

References

External links
 Wildlife Conservation Society - Congo Program
 Wildlife Conservation Society 
 Mbeli Bai Study
 Western-Gorilla.org

Geography of the Republic of the Congo